Plugged in Permanent is the seventh studio album by Canadian heavy metal band Anvil, released in 1996. The new official bass player was Glenn Gyorffy but studio bass tracks are credited to Mike Duncan, in his first and only release, replacing Ian Dickson. It is also the first release with Ivan Hurd on guitar replacing Sebastian Marino.

The title is a parody of the MTV Unplugged series of albums/performances. It is the band's first release on Massacre Records.

Track listing

Personnel
Anvil
Steve "Lips" Kudlow – vocals, lead guitar
Ivan Hurd – lead guitar
Mike Duncan – bass
Robb Reiner – drums

Production
Alfio Annibalini, Daryn Barry – engineers
Eddy Schreyer – mastering at Future Disc, Los Angeles

References

Anvil (band) albums
1996 albums
Massacre Records albums
Metal Blade Records albums